Naila Mohammed Habib Al Faran (1978 – 12 November 2015) was a Saudi doctor who was the first Saudi woman to specialize in nuclear medicine.

Early career
Faran began her medical career when she attended the summer program at the Faculty of Medical Sciences at King Saud University between 1998 and 1999, organized at the time by Saudi Aramco.
She also completed a training course in this field in 2000–2001 and graduated in 2002. She later joined the Advanced Imaging Unit at Dhahran Health Center, an affiliate of Saudi Aramco.

In 2006, she was selected for the Nuclear Medicine Certification Program in California. Meanwhile, she divided her time between study at Charles Draw University, Los Angeles, and on-the-job training at Saint Joseph Hospital in Orange State, and, finally, obtained her full certification in 2007.
Commenting on her experience at the Dhahran Health Center, Faran noted that she appreciated the center for its top nuclear medicine programs and its openness to innovation.
Nuclear medicine is a branch of medicine and medical imaging that uses nuclear properties of matter in diagnosis and therapy.

Death 
On November 11, 2015 in Faran died in Aramco Hospital in Dhahran in Saudi Arabia after a long illness.

References

1978 births
2015 deaths
Saudi Arabian women medical doctors